Fabrice Santoro defeated Rainer Schüttler 3–6, 7–5, 3–0 after Schüttler retired to win the 2000 Qatar Open singles competition. Schüttler was the defending champion.

Seeds

  Nicolas Kiefer (semifinals)
  Félix Mantilla (first round)
  Fabrice Santoro (champion)
  Younes El Aynaoui (semifinals)
  Hicham Arazi (first round)
  Jiří Novák (first round)
  Daniel Vacek (second round)
  Sjeng Schalken (quarterfinals)

Draw

Finals

Section 1

Section 2

External links
 2000 Qatar Open Singles Draw

Qatar Open
2000 Qatar Open
Qatar Open (tennis)